Heavenly is the third album by L'Arc-en-Ciel, released on September 1, 1995.

Track listing

Personnel
 hyde – vocals
 ken – guitar
 tetsu – bass guitar
 sakura – drums, percussion
 Takeshi Hadano – keyboards
 Akira Nishidaira – keyboards on track 2
 Jonathan E. Miles – voice on track 9

References

1995 albums
L'Arc-en-Ciel albums